Frances F. Berdan (born May 31, 1944) is an American archaeologist specializing in the Aztecs and professor emerita of anthropology at California State University, San Bernardino.

Berdan has authored many influential books about the Aztec civilization. In 1983, she received an "Outstanding Professor" award from California State University. In 1986, she was a fellow at Dumbarton Oaks with Michael E. Smith and other prominent Mesoamerican scholars. The result of that stay was the book Aztec Imperial Strategies (1986).

Works

References

Mesoamerican archaeologists
Aztec scholars
Living people
20th-century Mesoamericanists
21st-century Mesoamericanists
1944 births
American women archaeologists
20th-century American women writers
21st-century American women writers
20th-century American historians
21st-century American historians
20th-century American archaeologists
21st-century American archaeologists
California State University, San Bernardino faculty
American women historians